Amanda Jo Weir (born March 11, 1986) is an American competition swimmer, Olympic silver medalist, world champion, and former world record-holder. She was a member of the 2004 and 2012 United States Olympic teams, winning two silver medals at the 2004 Games and a bronze medal in the 4×100-meter freestyle relay at the 2012 Summer Olympics and a silver medal in the 4×100-meter freestyle relay at the 2016 Summer Olympics.

Career
Born in Davenport, Iowa, Weir started swimming while the family lived in Apple Valley, Minnesota.

Weir holds many of the sprint freestyle age-group records for USA Swimming, setting her first record at age 12 in the 50-yard freestyle in 23.17 seconds. She attended Brookwood High School in Snellville, Georgia, and led the Brookwood swim team to four consecutive Georgia Class 5A state championships.

At the 2004 Summer Olympics, Weir swam the third leg for the U.S. team in the women's 4×100-meter freestyle relay. Leading after her leg of the relay, the U.S. team finished second to the Australians, setting an American record with their finishing time. Weir also earned a silver medal by swimming in the preliminary heats of the 4×100-meter medley relay and helping her team qualify for the final.

Weir enrolled as a freshman at the University of Georgia in 2004, where her team dominated the 2005 NCAA championships; Weir anchored four of the unprecedented five winning Georgia relay teams. She was recognized as the Atlanta Amateur Athlete of the Year for 2005. Weir left the University of Georgia after her first year and transferred to the University of Southern California in 2006. After a single semester at USC, Weir decided to end her college swimming career to begin swimming professionally.

At the 2006 ConocoPhillips USA Swimming National Championship, Weir broke the American record in the 100-meter freestyle with a time of 53.58.

At the 2012 United States Olympic Trials in Omaha, Nebraska, Weir made the U.S. Olympic team for the second time by finishing fifth in the 100-meter freestyle with a time of 54.41, which qualified her to swim in the 4×100-meter freestyle as a member of the U.S. relay team. At the 2012 Summer Olympics in London, she earned a bronze medal as a member of the U.S. team in the women's 4×100-meter freestyle relay.

In 2016, she won a silver medal at the Olympic Games in the 4×100-meter freestyle relay.

Relation to Burl Ives
Amanda Weir is the great niece of Burl Ives.

See also

List of Olympic medalists in swimming (women)
List of Pan American Games records in swimming
List of United States records in swimming
List of University of Georgia people
List of University of Southern California people
List of World Aquatics Championships medalists in swimming (women)
World record progression 4 × 100 metres medley relay

References

External links
 
 
 
 
 
 

1986 births
Living people
American female freestyle swimmers
Georgia Bulldogs women's swimmers
Medalists at the FINA World Swimming Championships (25 m)
Medalists at the 2012 Summer Olympics
Medalists at the 2004 Summer Olympics
Olympic bronze medalists for the United States in swimming
Olympic silver medalists for the United States in swimming
People from Snellville, Georgia
Sportspeople from Davenport, Iowa
Swimmers at the 2003 Pan American Games
Swimmers at the 2004 Summer Olympics
Swimmers at the 2012 Summer Olympics
Swimmers at the 2016 Summer Olympics
USC Trojans women's swimmers
World Aquatics Championships medalists in swimming
World record holders in swimming
Swimmers at the 2015 Pan American Games
Pan American Games gold medalists for the United States
Medalists at the 2016 Summer Olympics
Pan American Games medalists in swimming
People from Apple Valley, Minnesota
Sportspeople from the Atlanta metropolitan area
Medalists at the 2003 Pan American Games
Medalists at the 2015 Pan American Games